Lucas Tomas Jensen (born 8 October 1994) is a Danish professional footballer who plays as a winger for Danish 1st Division club Vendsyssel FF.

Jensen started his career with Viborg FF, where he made his professional debut. He signed with Odense Boldklub in 2014 and played there for two years before having cancelled his contract. Jensen later signed a one-year deal with Hobro IK. He left after one season after his contract expired, and signed with Vendsyssel FF, helping both Hobro and Vendsyssel to promotion to the Danish Superliga in the 2016–17 and 2017–18 seasons.

Club career

Viborg FF
Jensen played his first official game for VFF on 5 April 2012, in a match against AB, which ended 2–2. Jensen came on the pitch in the 60th minute.

OB
At the age of 19, Jensen joined the Danish Superliga club Odense Boldklub on 17 January 2014.

Jensen got his debut for OB on 25 July 2014 against FC Vestsjælland.

His time in Odense came to an end on 14 July 2016, when his contract was cancelled by mutual agreement.

Hobro IK
On 14 July 2016, the same day as his contract was cancelled by OB, Hobro IK, who had just been relegated to the Danish second division signed Jensen to a one-year deal. On 21 July 2016, exactly a week after being signed, Jensen made his competitive debut in Hobro's season opener against FC Roskilde, an away defeat that ended 3–1. On 12 March 2017, he scored his only goals for Hobro, a brace, in the 5–1 away win over Vejle Boldklub. After the season, which saw Hobro promote to the Danish Superliga, Jensen's contract was not extended.

Vendsyssel FF
On 15 June 2017, Jensen signed with Danish second division club Vendsyssel FF on a two-year contract. Jensen made his debut on 30 July 2017 in a 2–0 home win against Fremad Amager where he scored both goals.

Vejle BK
Newly relegated Danish 1st Division club Vejle Boldklub announced on 1 July 2019, that they had signed Jensen on a free transfer.

Return to Vendsyssel
On 22 August 2021, Jensen returned to his former club Vendsyssel FF.

Personal life
Jensen has studied at Viborg Katedralskole and Hald Ege Efterskole.

References

External links
 
 Lucas Jensen on DBU

1994 births
Living people
People from Holstebro
Association football wingers
Danish men's footballers
Danish Superliga players
Danish 1st Division players
Viborg FF players
Odense Boldklub players
Hobro IK players
Vendsyssel FF players
Vejle Boldklub players
Denmark youth international footballers
Sportspeople from the Central Denmark Region